Paul Thomas Cook (born 20 July 1956) is an English drummer and member of the punk rock band the Sex Pistols. He was also called "Cookie" by his friends on the punk music scene.

Early life and career 

Cook was raised in Hammersmith and attended the Christopher Wren School, now Phoenix High School, London in White City Estate, Shepherd's Bush, where he met Steve Jones. The pair became good friends and while skipping school, in 1972–1973, Cook and Jones, along with their school friend Wally Nightingale, formed a band, The Strand. Within the next three years The Strand evolved into the Sex Pistols.

Cook's early influences included Motown, ska and glam rock acts like David Bowie, T. Rex, Roxy Music and Slade, in addition to drummers Kenney Jones of the Faces, Paul Thompson of Roxy Music, Al Jackson Jr. and Mitch Mitchell of The Jimi Hendrix Experience.

Cook is portrayed by Jacob Slater in the 2022 Craig Pearce – Danny Boyle FX biographical drama miniseries Pistol.

Later career 
After the Sex Pistols suddenly broke up after their final concert in San Francisco on 14 January 1978, Cook and Jones initially worked on the soundtrack to Julien Temple's film, The Great Rock 'n' Roll Swindle. The two also recorded a few songs using the Sex Pistols name, Cook singing lead on the album version of the song "Silly Thing". The pair then started a new band, The Professionals, with Andy Allan. Allan caused some legal problems; he played bass on "Silly Thing" and the first few Professionals recordings, but had no recording contract and had been neither credited nor paid. Consequently, the Virgin Records compilation album Cash Cows, which featured The Professionals' track "Kick Down the Doors", was withdrawn. Cook and Jones played together on Johnny Thunders' solo album, So Alone.

They released four singles, recorded a self-titled LP that was shelved until 1990, and released I Didn't See It Coming in November 1981. The band's American tour to promote the album was cut short when band members Cook, Paul Myers, and Ray McVeigh were injured in a car accident. While The Professionals did return to America in the Spring of 1982 after recovery, Jones and Myers' drug problems further hampered the band's prospects. They declined an opening spot offer on tour for The Clash, and broke up.

In the early 1980s, Cook, along with Jones, discovered the English new wave girl-group Bananarama. Cook helped the trio record their debut single, "Aie a Mwana", and acted as a producer on their 1982 debut album Deep Sea Skiving.

In the late 1980s, Cook surfaced with the group Chiefs of Relief with former Bow Wow Wow guitarist Matthew Ashman, and, after a period out of the music industry, played with Phil Collen in the 1990s. He also played on the Edwyn Collins song A Girl Like You, beginning a longstanding association with Collins as a session musician. Cook reunited with the surviving Sex Pistols in 1996 for the Filthy Lucre world tour.

The Sex Pistols, including Paul Cook, played a gig for the 30th anniversary of Never Mind The Bollocks at the Brixton Academy on 8 November 2007.  To meet demand, six further gigs were added, including two on 9 and 10 November.

In 2008, the Sex Pistols appeared at the Isle of Wight Festival as the headlining act on the Saturday night, the Peace and Love Festival in Sweden, the Live at Loch Lomond Festival in Scotland, and the Summercase Festival in Madrid.

Cook drummed with Man-Raze, which also featured Phil Collen from Def Leppard and their friend Simon Laffy who used to play in Collen's pre-Leppard band, Girl. They released a debut album Surreal in 2008, and toured throughout the UK in late 2009.

In 2011, Cook joined Vic Godard and Subway Sect, and renewed his collaborations with Paul Myers from The Professionals. Cook has worked with Godard, on and off, for the past two decades. They toured throughout 2012 and, in March 2012, recorded 1978 Now with Collins.

In celebration of the release of a three disc set (The Complete Professionals) by Universal Music Group for 16 October 2015, Cook, with Tom Spencer filling in for Steve Jones, reunited with The Professionals for a concert at the 100 Club. In January 2016, the band announced a three show tour for 17 to 19 March. A joint headline show featuring Rich Kids was announced at London's O2 Shepherd's Bush Empire for 16 May, then rescheduled for 23 June due to the ongoing structural work at the venue.

Personal life 
Cook lives in Hammersmith with his wife, Jeni Cook, formerly of Culture Club, and their daughter, Hollie Cook, a solo musician. Cook also played football for Hollywood United.

References

External links 
 Kick Down the Doors – Cook 'n' Jones website

1956 births
Living people
Sex Pistols members
British male drummers
English punk rock drummers
English songwriters
People from Hammersmith
People from Finchley
Man Raze members
Hollywood United players
Virgin Records artists
Warner Records artists
Subway Sect members
Association footballers not categorized by position
Association football players not categorized by nationality